Escudé is a surname. Notable people with this surname include:

Carlos Escudé (1948–2021), Argentine academic and writer
Guillem Anglada-Escudé (born 1979), Spanish astrophysicist
Ignacio Escudé (born 1964), Spanish field hockey player
Jaime Escudé (born 1962), Spanish field hockey player
Julien Escudé (born 1979), French footballer
Laura Escudé, American composer and violinist
Nicolas Escudé (born 1976), French tennis player
Xavier Escudé (born 1966), Spanish field hockey player

See also